Forum Mart is a shopping mall located at Janpath, Bhubaneswar in the state of Odisha, India. The shopping destination is  spread over a floor area of two hundred thousand square feet. Publicly opened in 2004, the mall is one of the largest and oldest malls in Odisha. The mall has a total commercial space of 200,000 sq ft spread over four floors designed by the Forum Group. The Forum Group is known for establishing commercial complexes in India and abroad.

It contains approximately 50 outlets, including cafeterias, food courts, restaurants, parking space and a hypermarket.

Specifications
100% Power Backup
Fire Fighting System
HVAC and AHU
RCC Framed Earthquake Resistant

Features

Leisure
Plaza

Hospitality
Cafeteria
Food Court 
Restaurants

Business
Office Spaces

Others
Departmental Anchors  
Hypermarket

Fire safety 
An inspection by Odisha Fire Services department in 10 malls including Forum Mart found several lapses in implementation of adequate fire safety measures.

References

Bhubaneswar
Shopping malls in Odisha